The 2022–23 Sacramento State Hornets men's basketball team represented California State University, Sacramento in the 2022–23 NCAA Division I men's basketball season. The Hornets, led by first-year head coach David Patrick, played their home games at the Hornets Nest in Sacramento, California as members of the Big Sky Conference.

Previous season
The Hornets finished the 2021–22 season 11–18, 6–14 in Big Sky play to finish in a tie for eighth place. In the Big Sky tournament, they defeated Idaho in the first round, before falling to Montana State in the quarterfinals.

On April 5, interim head coach Brandon Laird found out that he wouldn't be retained as head coach, following the school's announcement that Oklahoma associate head coach David Patrick would be the team's next head coach.

Roster

Schedule and results

|-
!colspan=12 style=| Non-conference regular season

|-
!colspan=12 style=| Big Sky regular season

|-
!colspan=12 style=| 

Sources

References

Sacramento State Hornets men's basketball seasons
Sacramento State Hornets
Sacramento State Hornets men's basketball
Sacramento State Hornets men's basketball